Mogoșești, also known as Mogoșești-Iași, is a commune in Iași County, Western Moldavia, Romania. It is composed of four villages: Budești, Hadâmbu, Mânjești and Mogoșești.

Natives
 Gheorghe Maftei

References

Communes in Iași County
Localities in Western Moldavia